Chramosta (feminine Chramostová) is a Czech surname. Notable people with the surname include:

 Jan Chramosta (born 1990), Czech footballer
 Vlasta Chramostová (1926–2019), Czech actress

Czech-language surnames